Joculator sublima is a species of minute sea snail, a marine gastropod mollusc in the family Cerithiopsidae. The species was described by Marshall in 1978.

References

Gastropods described in 1978
salvati